cons is a fundamental function in all dialects of the Lisp programming language.

Cons or CONS may also refer to:

Science and technology
 Connection-Oriented Network Service, one of the two OSI network layer protocols
 CONS, a build automation Make replacement, written in Perl, succeeded by SCons
 Coagulase negative staphylococci (CoNS), a group of round bacteria lacking the enzyme coagulase

Other uses
 Converse (shoe company), an American shoe manufacturer
 Emma Cons (1838–1912), British social reformer, socialist, educationalist and theatre manager

See also
 Con (disambiguation)